LolliLove is a 2004 American mockumentary co-written by, directed by and starring Jenna Fischer. The film satirizes a hip, misguided Southern California couple who decide to make a difference in the lives of the homeless by giving them lollipops with a cheery slogan on the wrapper.

Production
The film stars James Gunn, Fischer's then-husband, and Peter Alton, who were also co-writers, though about half of the film's dialogue was improvised by the cast. Fischer talked about the creative process behind the film in an interview with a St. Louis magazine:

The film mixes fact and fiction: Gunn's and Fischer's characters are named James and Jenna Gunn, the film was shot in their actual home, and it incorporates footage from their real-life wedding and home movies.

Principal photography cost $1,500 and was completed in 12 days. The film premiered at the St. Louis International Film Festival (in the hometown of Fischer and Gunn) in November 2004 and appeared at the Sonoma Valley Film Festival and the TromaDance Film Festival in 2005, and screened during the Cannes Film Festival market in May 2006.  It was released on DVD by Troma Entertainment on March 7, 2006.

Cast

Reception
The film received mostly positive reviews. A reviewer for Variety described it as "spot-on satire" and "chuckle-packed and satisfyingly tasteless" and wrote that the film "nails the condescending vapidity, manufactured drama and ludicrous self-importance of reality shows".   Adam Hackbarth, who interviewed Fischer, recommended the film as a "gritty and hilarious Trojan horse assault on the typical self-loving weekend philanthropist."  Upon the film's DVD release, the DVDTalk review said it is "one of the best films of the year - a riotous comedy about charity and the homeless. Really," in spite of being released by Troma Films, and credits director Fischer with infusing "the terribly tricky genre with just the right amount of raucous realism."  In Film Threat, the film is described as "so damned believable that it’s difficult, at times, to watch. Director Jenna Fischer has done a remarkable job here and if she continues on this esoteric and off-beat path she may find herself among the ranks of Christopher Guest and company." Nathan Rabin of The A.V. Club found it "funny, smart and casually satirical," but noted, "even at sixty-five minutes it still feels a little padded, like a killer short film on steroids."

Awards
For her role in the film, Fischer was awarded a Screen Actors Guild Emerging Actor Award.  
For her feature directorial debut, Fischer won the 2005 Kodak Independent Soul Award at the 2005 Tromadance film festival, hosted by the company that James Gunn previously worked for, where he created the cult classic Tromeo and Juliet.

References

External links

LolliLove (Flash video) at Hulu.com

2004 films
2004 comedy films
American comedy films
American satirical films
Films directed by Jenna Fischer
Films set in Los Angeles
American mockumentary films
Films with screenplays by James Gunn
Troma Entertainment films
2004 directorial debut films
2000s English-language films
2000s American films